Trecenta (Trexenta in venetian) is a comune (municipality) in the Province of Rovigo in the Italian region Veneto, located about  southwest of Venice and about  west of Rovigo.

Trecenta borders the following municipalities: Badia Polesine, Bagnolo di Po, Canda, Ceneselli, Giacciano con Baruchella, Salara.

Twin towns
 Conversano, Italy

References

External links

 Official website

Cities and towns in Veneto